See Communist party (disambiguation) for other similarly named groups.

The Communist Labour Party was a communist party in Scotland.  It was formed in September 1920 by the Scottish Workers' Committee and the Scottish section of the Communist Party (British Section of the Third International) (CP (BSTI)), some members of the Socialist Labour Party (SLP) and various local communist groups.  In the same month, the Communist Party of South Wales and the West of England was founded, with a very similar programme.

Under the influence of John Maclean MA, the group was provisionally named the Scottish Communist Party.  However, its founding conference, which Maclean did not attend, renamed it the Communist Labour Party.  It also decided that it should remain a provisional body with the aim of joining the Communist Party of Great Britain (CPGB), a position championed by Willie Gallacher.  His positions defeated, Maclean left the group and instead joined the SLP.  The Communist Labour Party then joined the CPGB, along with the remainder of the CP (BSTI) in January 1921.

References
Reclaiming Maclean
 Anti-Parliamentarianism and Communism in Britain, 1917-1921
The British Communist Left 1914-45, Mark Hayes (International Communist Current)

Communist Labour Party (Scotland)
Defunct communist parties in the United Kingdom
Defunct political parties in Scotland
Labour parties in Scotland
Political parties established in 1920
Communist Labour Party
Political parties disestablished in 1921
1920 establishments in Scotland
1921 disestablishments in Scotland